Stitch's Great Escape! was a "theater-in-the-round" attraction based on Disney's Lilo & Stitch franchise. A non-canon prequel to the original 2002 film that detailed Stitch's "first" prison escape, it was located in the Tomorrowland area of Magic Kingdom at the Walt Disney World Resort, as the fourth attraction to occupy the building and theater space that was previously used for Flight to the Moon, Mission to Mars and the ExtraTERRORestrial Alien Encounter. Designed by Walt Disney Imagineering, many of the animators who worked on Lilo & Stitch were directly involved with the attraction's development. The attraction, which struggled with a mixed reception from park guests during its existence, was the only major permanent attraction based on Lilo & Stitch to have operated in the United States; all other such major attractions since have been exclusive to non-American Disney Parks resorts.

History

On September 21, 2003, Magic Kingdom announced that a new Lilo & Stitch themed attraction would be replacing ExtraTERRORestrial Alien Encounter. On October 10, the park announced more details about the new attraction. It would be named Stitch's Great Escape! and would reuse the Alien Encounter technology. Because Alien Encounter was considered too scary and intense for kids, officials wanted to make the new attraction less scary and more family-friendly. Two days later, Alien Encounter would close to the public on October 12 and the Lilo & Stitch remodel was underway.

Stitch's Great Escape! opened on November 16, 2004. During the opening event, a large inflatable Stitch was outside the park's entrance, but as guests reached Main Street, U.S.A., they spotted some signs noticing that Stitch was causing chaos at the park. Guests could also find security guards who were looking for Stitch. In addition, the Cinderella Castle was decorated with toilet paper and a graffiti message that said, "Stitch is King". Cobra Bubbles told guests that Stitch was on the loose. The opening celebration soon began, but Stitch had already taken over the party with Elvis Presley singers. As he was being escorted off the stage, a large group of elementary school students arrived at the scene. They were dressed in Stitch hats and light blue t-shirts. Several guests were also given interviews with Stitch and Cobra Bubbles. Near the World of Disney store over at Disney Springs, then called Downtown Disney, there was a van that was hijacked by Stitch surrounded by police line ribbons and barriers. Inside the van, there were road signs, a travel guide map, shoes, and boxes with toy dinosaurs.

The attraction was met with mixed reception from guests, as some considered Stitch's Great Escape! a kid-friendly attraction, but others considered it as the worst attraction at Magic Kingdom. The most common complaint was the chili dog burp that made many guests nauseous.

At one time, Stitch's Great Escape! featured a FastPass entrance. When the system was modified to include wristbands instead of tickets, this entrance was removed as the popularity significantly declined.

After October 1, 2016, the attraction entered seasonal operation. In October 2017, the attraction's first pre-show area began being used as a costumed character greeting area for Stitch called Stitch's Alien Encounter Character Greeting!.

The attraction last operated on January 6, 2018, which led to speculation about the attraction's fate. The closure of Stitch's Great Escape! was said to be temporary, but in October, the Stitch animatronic and pre-show were completely dismantled. In 2019, the exterior was given a fresh coat of paint. On July 16, 2020, Disney confirmed that the attraction was permanently closed, with the attraction's signage later taken down on August 10, 2020.

Attraction summary

Pre-show

Guests enter the Galactic Federation Prisoner Teleport Center, where the attraction takes place. As the doors open, guests enter the first pre-show. The Grand Councilwoman (voiced by Zoe Caldwell) will be shown on the television screens, telling the guests that they will be guards for the United Galactic Federation. After being taught the basic procedures of guard duty, guests enter the second pre-show, where they are introduced by a robot known as Sergeant C4703BK2704-90210 (Richard Kind). He performs a demonstration of the teleportation tubes using an alien named Skippy, who appeared in the former ExtraTERRORestrial Alien Encounter. After the demonstration, Captain Gantu (Kevin Michael Richardson) gives an alert of a Level 3 prisoner being beamed to the center, at which point Sergeant 90210 faints. Guests are then instructed by Pleakley (Kevin McDonald) over a public-address system to proceed to the High Security Level 3 prisoner teleportation chamber.

Main show
Inside the chamber, guests take a seat, and the shoulder restraints lower into place (to not confuse the prisoner's DNA with the guests'). On screens, First Officer Ombit and Ensign Getco will be helping guests with the demonstration. The prisoner is then beamed into the chamber via a large plume of smoke and was revealed to be Experiment 626 (Chris Sanders), who calls himself "Stitch". Gantu tells Ombit, Getco, and the guests to keep an eye on Stitch, while he goes straighten all this out on the Level 3 prisoners.

Stitch begins to spit water in any direction, as Ombit and Getco wonder why the cannons are misfiring. The computer tells that the power is reducing after each spit. Following the second spit, Ombit realizes that the system is shutting down. The third spit leads to the screens powering down. As the computer indicates that power has decreased 80%, the TV screens turn off and smoke effects begin to blast. Loud explosions can be heard as all the lights in the chamber go out, allowing Stitch to escape. Now in complete darkness, Ombit and Getco tell the guests to stay seated and to not let the prisoner out of their sight. As Ombit and Getco go fix the problem, Stitch destroys a cell phone. He begins to stalk the guests, tickling their heads and jumping on the shoulder restraints. Guests can hear Stitch scurry around the chamber in the speakers as he smells food. Stitch steals a chili dog from a guest and eats it. Soon afterward, Stitch makes a big burp, causing a noxious smell to spray into the chamber.

When Gantu returns to the chamber, Ombit and Getco inform him that the prisoner is loose. When the power comes back on via emergency power, the laser cannons continue their attempt to bring Stitch down. Again using the cannons' fatal flaws, he manages to fire the laser cannons into the crowd. As the lights and TV screens in the chamber are turned off a second time, Stitch begins to leap onto the shoulder restraints and terrorizes the guests for a second time while uses his antennas to tickle the guests' heads. Then, he reappears in the teleportation tube and escapes to the Magic Kingdom in Florida. Cameras capture him going into Cinderella Castle where Stitch gets into the castle by claiming to be Prince Charming from Cinderella. Off-camera, Cinderella (Jennifer Hale) realizes that Stitch is not her prince, and kicks him out of the room. Stitch then licks the camera on the screens. The original ending of the attraction had Stitch stalk park guests on Astro Orbiter, with the ending video changing depending on the time of day at the park. This ending was eventually swapped in March 2005. The guests are then released from their restraints and exit into one of two gift shops; Merchant of Venus or Star Traders (previously Mickey's Star Traders during the attraction's run). On the way to the gift shops, guests see a sign labeled "Days without an escape" and a big number going down, along with "wanted posters" featuring some of Stitch's creator Jumba Jookiba's other genetic experiments.

Technology
The attraction included much of the technology and sets from its predecessor, the ExtraTERRORestrial Alien Encounter, including the comical alien Skippy in the second pre-show area. The two 39-inch Audio-Animatronic Stitch figures built by Imagineering were reportedly one of the most complex creations of their size. Other special effects include binaural sound, simulated laser cannons, and a pungent smell of a chili dog.

References

External links
 
 

Amusement rides introduced in 2004
Amusement rides that closed in 2018
Lilo & Stitch in amusement parks
Amusement rides based on film franchises
Magic Kingdom
Tomorrowland
Audio-Animatronic attractions
2004 establishments in Florida
2018 disestablishments in Florida
Former Walt Disney Parks and Resorts attractions